The Lost Boys is a 2016 comic book series published by Vertigo Comics. It is a sequel to the 1987 vampire film The Lost Boys.

Plot 
Michael, Sam and the Frog Brothers must protect Star from her sisters, the Blood Belles.

References

External links 
 

The Lost Boys (franchise)
2016 comics debuts
Vertigo Comics limited series
Gothic comics